Group H of the 2019 FIBA Basketball World Cup was the group stage of the 2019 FIBA Basketball World Cup for , ,  and . Each team played each other once, for a total of three games per team, with all games played at Dongfeng Nissan Cultural and Sports Centre, Dongguan. After all of the games were played, the top two teams with the best records qualified for the Second round and the bottom two teams played in the Classification Round.

Teams

Standings

Games
All times are local (UTC+8).

Canada vs. Australia
This was sixth game between Canada and Australia in the World Cup. The Australians won the last match-up in 1998. The Canadians won in the 2000 Olympics, the last competitive game between the two teams.

Senegal vs. Lithuania
This was the first competitive game between Senegal and Lithuania.

Australia vs. Senegal
This was the first game between Australia and Senegal in the World Cup. The Australians won in the 1980 Olympics, the last competitive game between the two teams.

Lithuania vs. Canada
This was the second game between Lithuania and Canada in the World Cup. The Lithuanians won the first match-up in 2010, the last competitive game between the two teams.

Canada vs. Senegal
This was the third game between Canada and Senegal in the World Cup. The Canadians won the last match-up in 1998. The Canadians also won in the 2016 FIBA World Olympic Qualifying Tournament, the last competitive game between the two teams.

Lithuania vs. Australia
This was the fourth game between Lithuania and Australia in the World Cup. The Australians won the last match-up in 2014. The Australians also won in the 2016 Olympics, the last competitive game between the two teams.

References

External links

 
2019–20 in Australian basketball
2019–20 in Canadian basketball
2019–20 in Lithuanian basketball